Kaplica may refer to:

Kaplica, Świętokrzyskie Voivodeship, Poland
Kaplica, Pomeranian Voivodeship, Poland
Kaplıca, Northern Cyprus
Kaplıca, Çat